KOBS-LD, virtual and UHF digital channel 19, is a low-powered Bounce TV-affiliated television station licensed to San Antonio, Texas, United States. The station is owned by HC2 Holdings.

History 
The station’s construction permit was initially issued on March 13, 1997 under the calls of K64EL and reassigned K63GD. On March 5, 1998, it was reassigned as DK63GD, and returned to K63GD on June 25, 1998. It was moved to KOBS-LP on December 28, 1999, and to its current callsign of KOBS-LD on May 11, 2011.

Digital channels
The station's digital signal is multiplexed:

References

External links
DTV America

Bounce TV affiliates
Buzzr affiliates
Low-power television stations in the United States
Innovate Corp.
Television channels and stations established in 1997
1997 establishments in Texas
OBS-LD